Muricopsis testorii is a species of sea snail, a marine gastropod mollusk in the family Muricidae, the murex snails or rock snails.

The species was first described in 2008 from specimens found in the northwest of the island of São Tomé, São Tomé e Príncipe.

References

Muricidae
Endemic fauna of São Tomé Island
Invertebrates of São Tomé and Príncipe
Gastropods described in 2008